Friedrich Loos was an Austrian Biedermeier style painter, etcher and lithographer. He was born in Graz on 29 October 1797. He studied at the Vienna Academy with Joseph Mössmer and also went on study tours through the Austrian Alpine regions. From 1835 to 1836 he lived in Vienna, and as of 1846 he sojourned in Rome. He then moved to Kiel, where he worked as a drawing teacher at the university as of 1863 and where he also died on 9 May 1890. In his pictures he emphasized light and color in order to loosen up his painting, as well as to harmonize and unite the details.

References
 Gsodam: Loos (Joseph) Friedrich. In: Austrian Biographical Encyclopaedia 1815-1950 (ÖBL). Volume 5 Austrian Academy of Sciences, Vienna 1972, p 309 et seq (direct links on S. 309, S. 310).
 Friedrich Loos, in: Ulrich Schulte-Wülwer, longing for Arcadia - Schleswig-Holstein artists in Italy, Heath 2009, pp. 228–235.

External links 
    View from the Old Castle Road to the Village

19th-century Austrian painters
19th-century Austrian male artists
Austrian male painters
Austrian printmakers
Austrian etchers
Austrian lithographers
Art educators
Artists from Graz
1797 births
1890 deaths
Academic staff of the University of Kiel